The 2011 season was Molde's 4th consecutive year in Tippeligaen, and their 35th season in the top flight of Norwegian football. Molde became league champions for the first time in club history.

Molde FK's U19 squad played in the inaugural tournament of the NextGen series.

Season events

June
Start. In Drammen, Molde won 1–0 against Strømsgodset. Pape Paté Diouf scored the game's only goal in the 13th minute. 19 June marked Molde's 100th anniversary, and saw Molde play against Sogndal. Molde won with the score 2–0, their third consecutive league game for the first time this season, after goals scored by Pape Paté Diouf and Magne Hoseth. Molde played with a retro kit with blue and white vertical stripes, which was a copy of Molde's kits from 1914. The win made sure Molde overtook the leading position in the league for the first time in the 2011 Tippeligaen season, a lead the team hold onto until the end of the season. Molde advanced to the quarter-finals of the Norwegian Cup through a 3–1 win at Aker Stadion against Hønefoss in the Fourth Round. A three-game winning streak ended on 26 June, when Molde lost 0–1 away to Odd Grenland. Molde won their fifth game in June, out of six possible, when they won 2–1 away against Vålerenga on 29 June.

July

Pape Paté Diouf scored four goals against Aalesund on 3 July when Molde continued to show great league form with a 5–2 win against their Møre og Romsdal rivals. The game was Diouf's last before his departure to Danish side FC Copenhagen nine days later. They avenged the 0–5 loss against Haugesund with a 3–1 win at Aker Stadion on 17 July. Daniel Chima Chukwu gave the home team an early lead before Mattias Moström scored twice. Molde were supposed to play against Start in Kristiansand on 22 July, but this match was postponed to 4 August due to the 2011 Norway attacks. Vålerenga were beaten for the second time in just over a month when Molde won 2–1 at home on 30 July.

August
Molde won the postponed match away to Start with the score 2–1, their fifth consecutive league win. Start took the lead early in the second half through a goal from Ole Martin Årst, then Molde turned the game around in eleven minutes with goals from Chima Chukwu and Joshua Gatt. Magne Hoseth gave the team a lead at Lerkendal Stadion on 7 August, but Rosenborg scored a controversial goal only five minutes later. Simen Wangberg scored with his hand, a goal Molde manager Solskjær described as an ugly goal which was incompatible with fair play. Two goals from Rade Prica in the second half made sure Molde had to leave Trondheim with a 1–3 defeat. They were eliminated from the Norwegian Cup on 14 August when Fredrikstad won 3–2 after extra time in the quarter-final stage at Fredrikstad Stadion. Eikrem and Angan turned a 0–1 deficit, but Amin Askar equalised late in the second half. Etzaz Hussain won the game for the home side with his goal in the 117th minute. On 22 August, Magnus Wolff Eikrem scored the only goal of the game against Lillestrøm at Aker Stadion. Molde went to Ålesund on 28 August and continued their good form with a 3–1 win, their eighth out of the last ten in the league. Gatt scored Molde's first goal in the opening minute, followed by goals from Hoseth and Makhtar Thioune. Magnus Sylling Olsen scored Aalesund's consolation goal in the last minute. By the end of August, the team's good results led to an eight points gap, although with one more game to play, down to runners-up Tromsø.

September
The home game against Brann on 11 September ended with a 2–2 draw, but was best remembered for the kick-off being 75 minutes delayed due to problems with the floodlights. Brann could have protested and received three points without playing the game, but chose not to, a decision praised by Solskjær. The 2–2 draw was a result of a brace from Eikrem in the first half and two goals from Lars Grorud in the second half, the last in stoppage time. Angan scored the winner in Molde's 1–0 away win against Fredrikstad on 17 September. Molde's game against Viking on Aker Stadion on 23 September ended with a goalless draw.

October–November
On 2 October, they took three points away from home as Tromsø were defeated at Alfheim Stadion. Within a few minutes after the 30th-minute mark, Forren and Berget were the goalscorers. Then followed a streak of draws that lasted three games; 0–0 at home against Odd Grenland, 1–1 away against Stabæk, and a 2–2 draw in what was a potentially league-defining game against Strømsgodset. On 30 October, before the match against Strømsgodset in the third-to-last game of the season, it was clear that Molde would become champions if they won. A tense first half ended goalless. In the second half, Magne Simonsen gave Molde the lead, but the goal was immediately equalised by Ola Kamara. In the 70th minute, Eikrem scored and Molde seemed to have won the league. Right before stoppage time, Anders Konradsen scored after a corner and equalised for Strømsgodset. The draw meant that Molde had to await the result from the game played later the same evening at Lerkendal Stadion between Rosenborg and Brann before they could know if they became champions or not that day. Brann took an early 3–0 lead and won the game 6–3. Rosenborg could no longer achieve the number of points needed to win the league and Molde were champions. Club captain Daniel Berg Hestad lifted the trophy at home ground after Molde's 3–1 win against Sarpsborg 08 on 20 November. Angan, Vini Dantas and Simonsen scored the goals for Molde. The season ended with a 1–2 defeat away to Sogndal. Zlatko Tripic scored Molde's last goal of the season, while Tore André Flo scored both for Sogndal.

Squad

Players on loan

Transfers

In

Out

Loan out

Source:

Coaching staff

Pre-season games

Copa del Sol

Competitions

Tippeligaen
See also 2011 Tippeligaen

Results summary

Results by round

Fixtures & results

Notes

League table

Norwegian Cup

Squad statistics

Appearances and goals

|-
|colspan="14"|Players who appeared for Molde no longer at the club:

|}

Goal scorers

Disciplinary record

Team kit 
This season's kits were produced by Umbro with Sparebanken Møre as the shirt sponsor. On 19 June 2011, in the Tippeliga-match against Sogndal, Molde played with a retro kit, which was a copy of Molde's kits from 1914, due to Molde's 100-year anniversary.

See also
Molde FK seasons

References 

2011
Molde
Norwegian football championship-winning seasons